The Glass Eye (Persian: Cheshm-e shisheyi) is a 1991 film by the Iranian director Hossein Ghasemi Jami. Jami also wrote the script for the film which starred Alireza Eshaghi, Javad Hashemi and Asghar Naghizadeh. Set in the context of the Iran-Iraq war, this is an example of Sacred Defence cinema.

References

Iran–Iraq War films
1990s Persian-language films
Iranian war films
1991 films